Coleophora trifariella is a moth of the family Coleophoridae. It is found from Germany and Poland to the Iberian Peninsula and Italy and from France to Romania. There is a disjunct population in Belarus. It is also known from Turkey.

The larvae feed on Chamaecytisus supinus, Coronilla, Cytisus scoparius, Genista pilosa, Genista tinctoria, Laburnum anagyroides, Lembotropis nigricans and Spartium junceum. They create an untidy lobe case of 7–8 mm composed of large leaf fragments. The mouth angle is about 45°. Larvae can be found up to June.

References

trifariella
Moths of Europe
Moths of Asia
Moths described in 1849